Peter Brandl (born 17 July 1988) is an Austrian footballer who currently plays for SV Bergern.

References

External links
 

1988 births
Living people
Austrian footballers
SKN St. Pölten players
Austrian Football Bundesliga players
Association football midfielders
People from Krems an der Donau
Footballers from Lower Austria